The Boyden Block, at 2 S. Main St. in Coalville, Utah, was built in 1906. It has also been known as Boyden Drugstore, The Hat Box, and Boyden Law Office. The building features Late Victorian and Early Commercial architecture. It was listed on the National Register of Historic Places in 2009. 

John Boyden, a lawyer in Coalville, was involved in land negotiations with Native Americans. Well after his death, he has been criticized for his performance, involving "Boyden's betrayal of the Hopi through a blatant conflict of interest".

See also
John Boyden House, also NRHP-listed in Coalville

References

External links

National Register of Historic Places in Summit County, Utah
Victorian architecture in Utah

Buildings and structures completed in 1906
1906 establishments in Utah